Ismail Mashal (Pashto and Persian: اسماعیل مشعل; born c. 1986) is an Afghan educator and former journalist who received international press attention from 2022 due to his public criticisms of the Taliban's decision to ban education for women and girls.

Career and personal life 
Mashal had worked as a professor for ten years at the time of his arrest in 2023, including at three different academic institutions, most recently his own private co-educational university in Kabul. By December 2022, when the Taliban announced that women would be prohibited from attending university, Mashal's university had 450 female students studying subjects including computer science, economics, engineering, and journalism.

Mashal lives in Kabul with his mother, wife, and daughter. Mashal's wife was a teacher prior to the 2021 Taliban offensive.

Activism 
Following the suspension of female students, Mashal chose to close his university completely, saying "education is either offered to all, or no one". Mashal has criticised the theological basis used by the Taliban to justify their actions, stating his belief that God and Muhammad both advocated for female education, and that the Quran specifically referenced education being compulsory for all genders. Mashal believed that forbidding education for women would lead to an increase in crime, as well as in poverty rates for Afghan citizens.

Mashal received national and international press attention in December 2022 during a live interview on TOLOnews when he ripped up his academic records in protest against the ban on university and secondary education for Afghan women. Mashal stated at the time that he did not consider his qualifications to be necessary due to Afghanistan no longer being a country that valued education. Videos of the interview went viral on social media, and Mashal was subsequently interviewed by international journalists including the BBC's Yalda Hakim; he told her that he would not stay silent even if he was threatened with death, and called on all men to stand up for the rights of Afghan women and girls.

In February 2023, Mashal announced that he would distribute 21, 000 books from his university for free from a specially made cart by walking around the neighbourhoods of Kabul. He stated he was doing so to protest the banning of female education.

Arrest and response 
On 2 February 2023, Mashal was arrested while distributing books in the Deh Bori settlement in District 3 of Kabul. 

Eyewitnesses, including Mashal's assistant, reported that Mashal was physically assaulted by Taliban security forces during his arrest. Abdul Haq Hammad, from the Ministry of Information and Culture, confirmed that Mashal had been arrested due to his "provocative actions" by inviting journalists to watch him handing out books on a main road, causing "chaos"; he said that Mashal had been treated well during his detainment. It has been reported that Mashal's family and friends have not been informed of his location since being arrested.

Mashal's arrest was covered locally by TOLOnews, and internationally, including by BBC News, Al Jazeera, and Radio France Internationale. Richard Bennett, the United Nations' Special Rapporteur on Afghanistan, called for Mashal's immediate release, calling the repression and targeting of peaceful civil activities as contrary to Afghanistan's international obligations. A spokesperson for the UN Secretary General António Guterres called for Mashal's immediate release and criticised the Taliban for "backsliding" on the issue of women.

As of 14 February 2023, Mashal's family reported that they had still been given no information from the Taliban about his whereabouts.

Release 
Mashal was released from custody on 5 March 2023, according to a statement given by his aide Farid Fazli to Agence France-Presse. Fazli said that Mashal was "fine and in good health" but was not "in a condition to talk at the moment".

References 

Living people
1986 births
Afghan journalists
Afghan educators
Afghan academics
Afghan activists